Thai Airways International operates a fleet of all widebody aircraft from Airbus and Boeing.

Current fleet

Overview
, Thai Airways International (excluding its subsidiaries Nok Air and Thai Smile) operates the following aircraft:

Gallery

Fleet development plans
THAI's fleet development plans, as of December 2011, for the period 2012–2022 is in three phases:

2012: Phase-out of 11 aging aircraft, delivery of 12 government-approved aircraft.
2013–2017: Phase out of 35 aging aircraft, delivery of 11 aircraft that have already been approved, and acquisition of 33 new aircraft, including 26 next-generation wide-bodied aircraft and 20 Airbus A320s.
2018–2022: Phase out Boeing 747-400s, Airbus A330-300, Airbus A380-800,and older Boeing 777s and acquisition of 15 next-generation wide-bodied aircraft to replace them. 3 777-300ERs will be delivered from Boeing throughout 2021 - as the original delivery date was moved forward due to COVID-19. The 3 aircraft will be fitted with Royal First Class to replace the first class demand routes. As of late 2020 THAI stored all Boeing 747-400s and Airbus A380-800s.

On 13 June 2011, Thai's Board of Directors announced it would purchase 15 aircraft and acquire the remaining 22 on operating leases. The purchased planes include 14 Boeing 777-300ERs, to be delivered in 2014 and 2015, and four Airbus A350-900s (2016 and 2017). The leased planes include six 787-8s and two 787-9s from US lessor International Lease Finance (ILFC). The 8 series will be delivered in 2014 and 2015, while the 9 series will be delivered in 2017. In addition, Thai will lease six A350-900s from Aviation Lease and Finance, to be delivered in 2017, and two A350-900s from CIT Aerospace International, which will deliver the aircraft in 2016. The airline will also lease six A320-200s from RBS Aerospace International, to be delivered in 2012 and 2013. All the operating leases have terms of 12 years each.

On 20 January 2016, Thai Airways International PCL announced plans to postpone taking delivery of 14 planes for three years to reduce operating costs as the national airline restructured. The 14 planes include 12 Airbus A350s, two of which were due to be delivered in 2016, and two Boeing 787s.

On 12 February 2016, Thai Airways announced it will continue to ground 10 Airbus A340s it had not been able to sell because flying the four-engine planes is not cost-effective, even after fuel prices plunged more than 40 percent in the previous year. Besides trying to offload the planes, which were used previously for long-haul destinations such as Frankfurt, the money-losing airline has cut routes and sold assets to bolster its balance sheet and operations.

In 2017, Thai took delivery of seven new aircraft and decommissioned two leased Airbus A330-300s bringing its active fleet to 100 as of 31 December 2017.

On 2 March 2021, Thai Airways submitted its rehabilitation plan to the Central Bankruptcy Court, followed by a press conference. Announced plans for the future of the airline including its fleet adjustments, reducing the number of aircraft types from 12 to five (or engine types from nine to four).

Remarks
Historically, THAI Airways had Boeing Customer Code D7. For example, a Boeing 747-400 aircraft that the airline ordered directly from Boeing Commercial Airplanes was coded Boeing 747-4D7. Since the introduction of the Boeing 787, Boeing no longer uses customer codes for the airline.

Fleet history

References

External links 

Aircraft information from Thai Airways official website
HS- registered aircraft information from Airfleet.net

Thai Airways International
Lists of aircraft by operator